is a district located in Tottori Prefecture, Japan.

As of 2003, the district has an estimated population of 48,540 and a density of 55.43 persons per km2. The total area is 875.74 km2.

Towns and villages 
Chizu
Wakasa
Yazu

Mergers

On November 1, 2004, the towns of Kawahara and Mochigase, and the village of Saji merged into the city of Tottori.
On March 31, 2005, the towns of Kōge, Funaoka and Hattō merged to form the new town of Yazu.

Districts in Tottori Prefecture